Economy of Korea may refer to:

Economy of South Korea
Economy of North Korea